Yvonne Sehmisch is a paralympic athlete from Germany competing mainly in category T54 sprint events.

Yvonne has competed in the 100 m, 200 m and 400 m at three consecutive Paralympics.  She won bronze medals in the 100 m and 200 m in her first games in 2000.

References

Paralympic athletes of Germany
Athletes (track and field) at the 2000 Summer Paralympics
Athletes (track and field) at the 2004 Summer Paralympics
Athletes (track and field) at the 2008 Summer Paralympics
Paralympic bronze medalists for Germany
German wheelchair racers
Living people
Medalists at the 2000 Summer Paralympics
Year of birth missing (living people)
Paralympic medalists in athletics (track and field)